Alaa Najjar is a physician, Wikipedian and internet activist, who was named the Wikimedian of the Year at Wikimania in August 2021 by Wikipedia co-founder Jimmy Wales for his pioneering role in the development of the Arab and medical communities as well as for his role in the development of COVID-19 topics.

With the Wikipedia username , Najjar is an active contributor to WikiProject Medicine and a volunteer administrator in the Arabic Wikipedia. He is a board member of Wikimedians of the Levant User Group and an editorial board member of the WikiJournal of Medicine.

Education and career
Najjar graduated from Alexandria University, faculty of medicine in January 2021 with a Bachelor of Medicine, Bachelor of Surgery (MB Bch). He is currently employed in “a very busy public hospital”, he told The National in 2021.

Wikipedia and Wikimedia activities

Najjar is an active contributor since 2014, and most of his edits focus on medicine-related articles. He also serves as an administrator on Arabic-language Wikipedia and in several other roles on different projects of Wikimedia Foundation. He is also a board member of Wikimedia Group in the Levant and editorial board member of the WikiJournal of Medicine since December 2018. Also, he is a member on the Arabic Wikipedia's official social networking team. 

He spearheaded the COVID-19 project on the Arabic encyclopedia and majorly contributes to the WikiProject Medicine. Najjar's work helps to combat medical misinformation and confront the pandemic with reliable, fact-checked information.  

He was named the Wikimedian of the Year on 15 August 2021 by Wikipedia co-founder Jimmy Wales. Najjar was praised for his pioneering role in the development of the Arab and medical communities as well as for his role in the development of COVID-19 topics. Because of travel restrictions, Wales could not personally deliver the award to Najjar as per standard practice, but instead spoke to him in a surprise Google Meet call.

See also
 List of Wikipedia people

References

Living people
Wikimedians of the Year
Wikipedia people
Year of birth missing (living people)
Alexandria University alumni
WikiJournal of Medicine
20th-century births
21st-century physicians
Internet activists